The EOS 450D (called EOS Rebel XSi in North America and EOS Kiss X2 in Japan) is a 12.2-megapixel digital single-lens reflex camera that is part of the Canon EOS line of cameras.  It is the successor to the EOS 400D/Digital Rebel XTi.  It was announced on 23 January 2008 and released in March 2008 and April 2008 in North America. It was succeeded by the Canon EOS 500D (Rebel T1i in North America) which was announced on 25 March 2009.

Like its predecessors, it takes EF and EF-S lenses as well as a large selection of EOS system accessories.

Features
 12.2-megapixel CMOS sensor.
 DIGIC III image processor
 14-bit analog-to-digital signal conversion
  LCD monitor
 Live View mode
 Nine-point AF with centre cross-type sensors
 Four metering modes, using 35-zones: spot, partial, center-weighted average, and evaluative metering.
 Built-in flash
 Auto lighting optimiser
 Highlight tone priority
 EOS integrated cleaning system
 sRGB and Adobe RGB color spaces
 ISO 100–1600 (separate ISO button similar to the Canon EOS-1D professional series)
 Continuous drive up to 3.5 frames per second (53 images (JPEG), 6 images (raw))
 Canon EF/EF-S lenses
 Canon EX Speedlites
 PAL/NTSC video output
 SD and SDHC memory card file storage 32GB max
 File Formats include: JPEG, raw (14-bit, Canon original, 2nd edition)
 Raw and large JPEG simultaneous recording
 USB 2.0 computer interface
 LP-E5 battery
 Optional BG-E5 battery grip
 Approximate weight

References

External links

 Official website

450D
Live-preview digital cameras
Cameras introduced in 2008